John Young (c. 1532 – 1605) was an English academic and bishop.

Early life
He was educated at Mercers' School in London, and graduated BA at the University of Cambridge in 1552. He became a Fellow of Pembroke Hall, Cambridge in 1553, and Master there in 1567. He was Vice-Chancellor of the University of Cambridge in 1569.

Career 
He became Bishop of Rochester in 1578, employing Edmund Spenser as secretary for a short time early in his tenure. In The Shepheardes Calender Young appears as Roffy, which abbreviates Roffensis, alluding to his see.

Notes

Further reading
Percy W. Long, Spenser and the Bishop of Rochester, PMLA, Vol. 31, No. 4 (1916), pp. 713–735.
Alexander Corbin Judson (1935), A biographical sketch of John Young, bishop of Rochester, with emphasis on his relations with Edmund Spenser

1532 births
1605 deaths
Bishops of Rochester
People educated at Mercers' School
Masters of Pembroke College, Cambridge
16th-century Church of England bishops
17th-century Church of England bishops
16th-century scholars
Vice-Chancellors of the University of Cambridge